Little Lost Lamb is a 1945 picture book by Margaret Wise Brown writing as Golden MacDonald and illustrated by Leonard Weisgard. The story is about a shepard who goes searching for a missing lamb. The book was a recipient of a 1946 Caldecott Honor for its illustrations.

References

1945 children's books
American picture books
Caldecott Honor-winning works
Doubleday (publisher) books